The 1934 Duke Blue Devils football team was an American football team that represented Duke University as a member of the Southern Conference during the 1934 college football season. In its fourth season under head coach Wallace Wade, the team compiled a 7–2 record (3–1 against conference opponents) and outscored opponents by a total of 185 to 40.  Jack Dunlap was the team captain. The team played its home games at Duke Stadium in Durham, North Carolina.

Schedule

References

Duke
Duke Blue Devils football seasons
Duke Blue Devils football